PP-145 Lahore-II is a Constituency of the Provincial Assembly of Punjab.

General elections 2013

General elections 2008

See also
 PP-144 Lahore-I
 PP-146 Lahore-III

References

External links
 Election commission Pakistan's official website
 Awazoday.com check result
 Official Website of Government of Punjab

Constituencies of Punjab, Pakistan